Sugar Pie DeSanto (born Peylia Marsema Balinton, October 16, 1935) is an American R&B singer and dancer, whose career in music flourished in the 1950s and 1960s.

Early life
DeSanto was born to an African-American mother, who was a concert pianist, and a Filipino father. She spent most of her early life in San Francisco, California, where she moved with her family at the age of four. She stands . As a girl she was friends with Etta James.

Career
Johnny Otis discovered DeSanto in 1955, and she toured with the Johnny Otis Revue. Otis gave her the stage name Sugar Pie. In 1959 and 1960, she toured with the James Brown Revue.

In 1960, DeSanto rose to national prominence when her single "I Want to Know", reached number four on Billboard'''s Hot R&B chart. She recorded the song with her husband, Pee Wee Kingsley. Soon thereafter their marriage ended. DeSanto moved to Chicago and signed with Chess Records in 1962 as a recording artist and writer. Among her recordings for Chess were "Slip-in Mules" (an "answer song" to "High Heel Sneakers"), "Use What You Got", "Soulful Dress" (her biggest hit for Chess), and "I Don't Wanna Fuss". DeSanto participated in the American Folk Blues Festival tour of Europe in 1964, and her lively performances, including wild dancing and standing back flips, were widely appreciated.
 
In 1965, DeSanto, under the name Peylia Parham, began a writing collaboration with Shena DeMell. They produced the song "Do I Make Myself Clear", which DeSanto sang as a duet with Etta James. It reached the top 10. It was followed by another DeSanto–James duet, "In the Basement", in 1966. DeSanto's next record, "Go Go Power", did not make the charts, and she and Chess parted ways.

DeSanto kept on writing songs and recorded for a few more labels without much success. She eventually moved back to the Bay Area, settling in Oakland.

Though it has often been said that her stage performances far surpassed her studio recordings, a full-length live recording, Classic Sugar Pie'', was not released until 1997.

DeSanto was given a Bay Area Music Award in 1999 for best female blues singer. In September 2008, she was given a Pioneer Award by the Rhythm and Blues Foundation. She received a lifetime achievement award from the Goldie Awards in November 2009.

DeSanto was honored on December 10, 2020 by the Arhoolie Foundation, a nonprofit that honors artists who preserve traditional music for future generations.

Personal life
DeSanto was married to Pee Wee Kingsley in the 1950s. After that marriage ended, she was married to Jesse Earl Davis for 27 years. In October 2006, Davis died attempting to extinguish a fire that destroyed their apartment in Oakland, California.

Popular singles

References

External links
 
 Bay-area-bands.com
 Pbs.org
 

1935 births
Living people
Musicians from Brooklyn
American women singers
American contraltos
American rhythm and blues singers
Songwriters from New York (state)
American female dancers
Record producers from New York (state)
American musicians of Filipino descent
Filipino people of African-American descent
West Coast blues musicians
Chess Records artists
Northern soul musicians
James Brown vocalists
Dancers from New York (state)
American women record producers
African-American women musicians